John Stanley Miszuk (born September 29, 1940 as Jan Miszuk) is a Polish-born Canadian former professional ice hockey defenceman who played in the National Hockey League (NHL) for the Detroit Red Wings, Chicago Black Hawks, Philadelphia Flyers and Minnesota North Stars between 1963 and 1970. He also played in the World Hockey Association (WHA) for the Michigan Stags/Baltimore Blades and Calgary Cowboys between 1974 and 1977.

Playing career
Miszuk was born in the Polish village of Nalibaki, which had been annexed into the Byelorussian SSR of Soviet Union during the Second World War. The family moved to Canada and he grew up in Hamilton, Ontario where he began playing hockey in the Ontario Hockey League (OHL). After a season with the Hamilton Red Wings, Miszuk turned professional and joined the Detroit Red Wings organization.

After playing in the Western Hockey League (WHL) and the American Hockey League (AHL) Miszuk moved up to the National Hockey League (NHL) with Detroit in 1963–64. At the end of that season he moved to the Chicago Black Hawks, but in the following three years he played only eight NHL games, spending most of his time in the minor leagues.

In the summer of 1967, Miszuk was chosen during NHL Expansion Draft by the Philadelphia Flyers, one of the six new franchises in the NHL. With the Flyers he found a place in NHL and he played two full seasons and then moved on to the Minnesota North Stars.

He eventually moved to the World Hockey Association (WHA) with the Michigan Stags. At the end of his career Miszuk returned again to the minor leagues, spending two seasons in the Pacific Hockey League (PHL) before retiring from the competitive event.

Career statistics

Regular season and playoffs

References

External links
 

1940 births
Living people
Baltimore Blades players
Buffalo Bisons (AHL) players
Calgary Cowboys players
Canadian expatriate ice hockey players in the United States
Canadian ice hockey defencemen
Canadian people of Polish descent
Chicago Blackhawks players
Detroit Red Wings players
Edmonton Flyers (WHL) players
Hamilton Tiger Cubs players
Hamilton Red Wings (OHA) players
Ice hockey people from Ontario
Iowa Stars (CHL) players
Michigan Stags players
Minnesota North Stars players
Philadelphia Flyers players
Pittsburgh Hornets players
San Diego Gulls (WHL) players
San Diego Hawks players
San Francisco Shamrocks players
Soviet emigrants to Canada
Sportspeople from Hamilton, Ontario
St. Louis Braves players